Citrus Belt League (C.B.L.) is a high school sports league in the Inland Empire region within the Greater Los Angeles area of California's CIF Southern Section. The Citrus Belt League was one of the first leagues in 1913 when the California Interscholastic Federation (CIF) was established under a different name. The league dates back to the 1890s, with founding members Chaffey High School of Ontario, Redlands High School, Riverside High School (now known as Riverside Poly) and San Bernardino High School. It was the only Division I league in the San Bernardino-Riverside County area since its inception, until 2006, when CIF Southern Section releagued it to Division II. The league also organizes an Academic Decathlon competition.

History
The original CBL included Pomona High School, Riverside High School, San Bernardino High School, Redlands High, Colton High, and Ontario's Chaffey High School. The league dates back to the 1890's. When the CIF Southern Section athletics was established, CBL was a founding member. During this tenure, Redlands High and Chaffey High played in football 68 times between 1903 and 1986, making it one of the state's longest running and oldest rivalries in the sport.

The early 1990s saw a four-year stint in which high desert schools Apple Valley High School, Hesperia High School, and Victor Valley High School combined in a six-team league with Redlands High School and Fontana High School. 
Beginning the 2012-13 season, Fontana High school left for the Sunkist league ending its sixty year membership.
In the 2014–15 season, the league expanded to an eight-team realignment, adding Rialto's Carter High School, and the newly built Redlands Citrus High.
When the Citrus Belt area leagues realigned for the 2018-2020 period, Eisenhower left for the San Andreas League, ending a 45-year membership in the CBL.

Other past members include Colton High School, Corona High School, Palm Springs High School, Moreno Valley High School, Riverside's Rubidoux High School, Ramona High School and Poly High, San Bernardino's San Gorgonio High School, Pacific High School, Rialto's Eisenhower High and Rialto High School, Fontana's FoHi and  A.B. Miller High School.

Members
Cajon High School Cowboys (San Bernardino)
Member since: 2013
Beaumont High School Cougars (Beaumont)
Member since: 2020
Redlands Citrus Valley High School Blackhawks (Redlands)
Member since: 2013
Redlands East Valley High School Wildcats  (Redlands)
Member since: 1997
Redlands High School Terriers (Redlands)
Member since: 1906
Yucaipa High School Thunderbirds (Yucaipa)
Member since: 2007

Sports

Fall Season (September–November)
Football  
Girls Volleyball 
Girls Golf
Cross Country Running
Girls Tennis
Boys Water Polo

Winter Season (December–February)
Girls Water Polo
Boys Basketball 
Girls Basketball 
Boys Soccer
Girls Soccer
Wrestling

Spring Season (March–May)
Boys Golf
Baseball
Softball
Badminton
Boys Track and Field
Girls Track and Field
Boys Swimming
Girls Swimming
Boys Tennis
Boys Volleyball

References

CIF Southern Section leagues